Dicentrus bidentatus is a species of beetle in the family Cerambycidae. It was described by Champlain and Knull in 1926.

References

Cerambycinae
Beetles described in 1926